Omphalota is a monotypic snout moth genus. Its one species, Omphalota chlorobasis, was described by George Hampson in 1899. It is known from India (including Simla, the type location).

References

Epipaschiinae
Monotypic moth genera
Moths of Asia
Pyralidae genera